Giant cockroaches, or blaberids (family Blaberidae)  are the second-largest cockroach family by number of species.

Description

They are the only ovoviviparous cockroach family.  The ootheca is seen very briefly before being retracted into the body, where soon after the young nymphs hatch inside, the female gives live birth. The cerci are smaller compared to other families, and most of the time are covered by wings.  They're mostly found in caves, rotting logs or buried under leaf litter. Many are often kept as pets or as feeder insects, such as Blaberus, Gromphadorhina or Macropanesthia.

Notable species
Notable species within this family include:

 Cape mountain cockroach – Aptera fusca
 Dwarf cave cockroach – Blaberus atropos (syn. Blaberus fusca)
 Death's head cockroach – Blaberus craniifer
 False death's head cockroach – Blaberus discoidalis
 Giant cave cockroach – Blaberus giganteus
 Dubia cockroach – Blaptica dubia
Orange head cockroach – Eublaberus posticus
 Glowspot cockroach – Lucihormetica verrucosa
 Beetle cockroach – Diploptera punctata
Chrome cockroach – Gyna caffrorum
 Green banana cockroach – Panchlora nivea
 Halloween hissing cockroach – Elliptorhina javanica
 Wide horned hissing cockroach – Gromphadorhina oblongonota
 Madagascar hissing cockroach – Gromphadorhina portentosa
 Speckled cockroach – Nauphoeta cinerea
 Surinam cockroach – Pycnoscelus surinamensis
 Australian wood cockroach – Panesthia cribrata
 Giant burrowing cockroach – Macropanesthia rhinoceros
 Emerald cockroach – Pseudoglomeris magnifica

Genera
This family contains over 1,200 species within 135 genera and 12 subfamilies. 

Subfamily Blaberinae
Archimandrita Saussure, 1893
Aspiduchus Rehn & Hebard, 1927
Bionoblatta Rehn, 1940
Blaberus Serville, 1831
Blaptica Stål, 1874
Byrsotria Stål, 1874
Eublaberus Hebard, 1920
Hemiblabera Saussure, 1893
Hiereoblatta  Rehn, 1937
Hormetica Burmeister, 1838
Hyporhicnoda Hebard, 1920
Lucihormetica Zompro & Fritzsche, 1999
Minablatta Rehn, 1940
Monachoda Burmeister, 1838
Monastria Saussure, 1864
Neorhicnoda Grandcolas, 1992
Oxycercus Bolívar, 1881
Paradicta Grandcolas, 1992
Parahormetica Brunner von Wattenwyl, 1865
Petasodes Saussure, 1864
Phoetalia Stål, 1874
Sibylloblatta Rehn, 1937
Styphon Rehn, 1930
Subfamily Diplopterinae
Diploptera Saussure, 1864
Subfamily Epilamprinae
Africalolampra Roth, 1995
Alphelixia Roth, 1973
Anisolampra Bey-Bienko, 1969
Antioquita Hebard, 1933
Aptera Saussure, 1864
Apsidopis Saussure, 1895
Ataxigamia Tepper, 1893
Audreia Shelford, 1910
Blepharodera Burmeister, 1838
Brephallus Wang, Zhao, Li, Che & Wang, 2018
Calolampra Saussure, 1893
Calolamprodes Bey-Bienko, 1969
Capucinella Hebard, 1920
Cariacasia Rehn, 1928
Colapteroblatta Hebard, 1919
Compsolampra Saussure, 1893
Cyrtonotula Uvarov, 1939
Dryadoblatta Rehn, 1930
Decoralampra Lucañas, 2017
Epilampra Burmeister, 1838
Galiblatta Hebard, 1926
Gurneya Roth, 1974
Haanina Hebard, 1929
Homalopteryx Brunner von Wattenwyl, 1865
Howintoniella Roth, 1981
Indoapterolampra Anisyutkin, 2014
Juxtacalolampra Roth, 1981
Litopeltis Hebard, 1920
Miroblatta Shelford, 1906
Molytria Stål, 1874
Morphna Shelford, 1910
Notolampra Saussure, 1862
Opisthoplatia Brunner von Wattenwyl, 1865
Orchidoeca Gurney & Roth, 1976
Paracalolamprodes Anisyutkin, 2015
Phlebonotus Saussure, 1862
Phoraspis Serville, 1831
Pinaconota Saussure, 1895
Placoblatta Bey-Bienko, 1969
Poeciloderrhis Stål, 1874
Princisola Gurney & Roth, 1976
Pseudophoraspis Kirby, 1903
Rhabdoblatta Kirby, 1903
Rhabdoblattella Anisyutkin, 1999
Rhicnoda Brunner von Wattenwyl, 1893
Stictolampra Hanitsch, 1930
Thorax Saussure, 1862
Ylangella Roth, 2002
Subfamily Geoscapheinae
Geoscapheus Tepper, 1893
Macropanesthia Saussure, 1895
Neogeoscapheus Roth, 1977
Parapanesthia Roth, 1977
Subfamily Gyninae
Alloblatta
Evea
Gyna
Paraprincisaria
Paraplecta
Princisaria
Progonogamia
Thliptoblatta
Subfamily Oxyhaloinae
Aeluropoda
Ateloblatta
Coleoblatta
Elliptorhina
Griffiniella
Gromphadorhina
Heminauphoeta
Henschoutedenia
Jagrehnia
Leozehntnera
Leucophaea
Nauphoeta
Oxyhaloa
Pelloblatta
Princisia
Pronauphoeta
Subfamily Panchlorinae
Achroblatta
Anchoblatta
Biolleya
Panchlora
Pelloblatta
Subfamily Panesthiinae
Ancaudellia
Annamoblatta
Caeparia
Microdina
Miopanesthia
Panesthia
Salganea
Subfamily Perisphaerinae
Bantua
Compsagis
Cyrtotria
Derocalymma
Ellipsica
Elliptoblatta
Gymnonyx
Hostilia
Hyposphaeria
Laxta
Neolaxta
Perisphaerus (= Perisphaeria)
Pilema (= Pronaonota)
Platysilpha
Poeciloblatta
Poeciloderrhis
Pseudoglomeris
Pseudocalolampra
Trichoblatta
Zuluia
Subfamily Pycnoscelinae
Pycnoscelus
Stilpnoblatta
Subfamily Zetoborinae
Capucina
Lanxoblatta
Parasphaeria
Phortioeca
Schizopilia
Shultesia
Thanatophyllum
Tribonium
Zetobora
Zetoborella
Incertae sedis
Africalolampra
Apotrogia
Cacoblatta
Diplopoterina
Eustegasta
Glyptopeltis
Gynopeltis
Hedaia
Kemneria
Isoniscus
Mesoblaberus
Mioblatta
Phenacisma
Pseudogyna

Taxonomy note
Among the genera of uncertain subfamily, Eustegasta and Isoniscus have been removed from subfamily Perisphaerinae .

References

 

Cockroach families